Yoon Mee-hyang (born 1964) is a South Korean human rights activist, politician, and author. She was the former head of the Korean Council for Justice and Remembrance for the Issues of Military Sexual Slavery by Japan, an organization dedicated to advocacy for former comfort women, who were forced into sexual slavery during World War II. She is the author of 25 Years of Wednesdays: The Story of the "Comfort Women" and the Wednesday Demonstrations.

In April 2020, Yoon was elected to National Assembly of the Republic of Korea, in a seat allocated by proportional representation.

In September 2020 Yoon was suspended from the Democratic Party after being indicted by the Seoul Western District Prosecutors’ Office on eight charges including fraud, embezzlement and breach of trust for misappropriating donations and government subsidies from the comfort women advocacy organization she was leading.

Education 
Yoon was born in Namhae, South Gyeongsang Province, in 1964. She graduated from Hanshin University in 1987 and earned a master's degree in social welfare from Ewha Womans University in 2007.

Advocacy 
Since the 1990s, Yoon has been a leader of the Korean Council for the Women Drafted for Military Sexual Slavery by Japan, now called the Korean Council for Justice and Remembrance for the Issues of Military Sexual Slavery by Japan. The organization was established in 1990 to advocate for the rights of former comfort women. Since January 1992, the council has organized over 1000 weekly rallies in front of the Japanese embassy in Seoul to raise awareness of the issue of war violence against women. The group has called upon the Japanese government to issue a formal apology and compensation to former comfort women.

Yoon's book on the subject, 20 Years of Wednesdays: The Unshakable Hope of the Halmoni  - Former Japanese Military Comfort Women, was published in 2010 in Korean, and translated into Japanese the following year. A 2016 follow-up, 25 Years of Wednesdays, included information on the new agreement between the Korean and Japanese governments to peacefully resolve the issue. An English translation by Koeun Lee was published in 2019.

Yoon established the War and Women's Human Rights Museum in Seoul in 2012. She has also served as a founding member of the Korea Women's Foundation and as executive director of the Women's Subcommittee of the National Reunification Movement. Yoon appears in The Apology, a documentary film directed by Tiffany Hsiung and featuring former comfort women Gil Won-Ok, Adela Reyes Barroquillo, and Cao Hei Mao.

Election 
On April 15, 2020, Yoon was elected to a proportional representation National Assembly seat as a candidate of the Platform Party, a satellite party of the Democratic Party of Korea.

Controversy 
In May 2020, Lee Yong-soo, a 91 year old comfort woman survivor, accused Yoon of not using the public donations to benefit the comfort women victims. In a press conference, Lee Yong-soo accused Yoon and her organization of financially and politically exploiting the survivors for 30 years. Lee also stated that Yoon “must not become a member of the National Assembly. She must first solve this problem.” Lee stated she did not support Yoon's parliamentary candidacy and accused Yoon of lying about having her support during the election.

As a result, the Korean Prosecutor-General, Yoon Seok-youl, ordered an investigation into the Korean Council for Justice and Remembrance for the allegations of financial fraud and embezzlement. , a lawmaker from the United Future Party, raised the issue that Yoon may have been using donations meant for the comfort women for personal purposes, while other lawmakers have called on her to resign from her seat. However, representatives of the ruling Democratic Party of which Yoon is a lawmaker-elect member, decided to wait for the outcome of the prosecutors’ investigation.

In September 2020, prosecutors formally indicted Yoon on charges including fraud, embezzlement and breach of trust. In addition Yoon has been accused of quasi-fraud against Gil Won-ok, another survivor, who, according to the prosecution, suffers from dementia, which Yoon exploited to press her into donating a total of 79.2 million won to the Korean Council between November 2017 and January 2020. 

Only then, the Democratic Party suspended the party membership of Rep. Yoon Mee-hyang, who became a proportional lawmaker based on her career of supporting comfort women survivors.

Awards and honours 
In 2012, Yoon was awarded the 9th annual Seoul Women's Award.

In 2013, Yoon was awarded the Late Spring Unification Award, given to individuals who have contributed to national reconciliation and reunification. The same year, she was named a co-winner of Hanshin University's Hanshin Prize, given to individuals for their outstanding contributions to society.

References 

Living people
1964 births
South Korean women activists
South Korean women's rights activists
South Korean human rights activists
Ewha Womans University alumni
People from Namhae County
Members of the National Assembly (South Korea)
South Korean politicians convicted of crimes
South Korean fraudsters
People convicted of embezzlement
Papyeong Yun clan